The Yerba Buena Stakes is a discontinued race for Thoroughbred fillies and mares age three and older. It was run on turf at Golden Gate Fields race track in Albany, California from 1973 through 2000 and again from 2005 through 2009. Between 2001 through 2004 the race was hosted by Bay Meadows Racetrack in San Mateo, California.

It was raced as the Yerba Buena Handicap from inception in 1973 through 2006.

Records 
Speed record: (at 1 3/8 miles)
 2:14.40 – Magdelaine (1988)

Most wins:
 2 – Star Ball (1977, 1978)
 2 – Mairzy Doates (1980, 1981)

Most wins by a jockey:
 4 – Russell Baze (1992, 1995, 2002, 2005)

Most wins by a trainer:
 4 – Ben Cecil (1996, 1998, 2006, 2009)

Most wins by an owner:
 4 – Gary A. Tanaka (1993, 1995, 2002, 2006)

Winners 
Equibase Yerba Buena Stakes history:

References 

Golden Gate Fields
Bay Meadows Racetrack
Discontinued horse races in the United States
Ungraded stakes races in the United States
Previously graded stakes races in the United States
Open middle distance horse races
Recurring sporting events established in 1936
Recurring sporting events disestablished in 2001
Horse races in California
Turf races in the United States